Mably may refer to:

 Gabriel Bonnot de Mably (1709–1785), French philosopher and politician
 Luke Mably (born 1976), British actor
 Mably, Loire, a commune in the Loire département in France